Stropkov District (okres Stropkov) is a district in the Prešov Region of eastern Slovakia. 
Until 1918, the district was mostly part of the county of Kingdom of Hungary of Zemplín, apart from an area in the 
north west around Duplín, Tisinec, Krušinec, Výškovce, Vislava, Oľšavka, Gribov and Kožuchovce which formed part of the county of Šariš.

Municipalities

Baňa
Breznica
Breznička
Brusnica
Bukovce
Bystrá
Bžany
Duplín
Gribov
Havaj
Chotča
Jakušovce
Kolbovce
Korunková
Kožuchovce
Krišlovce
Kručov
Krušinec
Lomné
Makovce
Malá Poľana
Miková
Miňovce
Mrázovce
Nižná Olšava
Oľšavka
Potoky
Potôčky
Soľník
Staškovce
Stropkov
Šandal
Tisinec
Tokajík
Turany nad Ondavou
Varechovce
Veľkrop
Vislava
Vladiča
Vojtovce
Výškovce
Vyšná Olšava
Vyšný Hrabovec

References 

Districts of Slovakia
Geography of Prešov Region